The Portland Skidmore/Old Town Historic District is an historic district in Portland, Oregon's Old Town Chinatown neighborhood, in the United States. The approximately 20-block area, center around Burnside Street and named after the Skidmore Fountain, is known for exhibiting Italianate architecture, though High Victorian Italianate, Renaissance Revival, Richardsonian Romanesque, and Sullivanesque styles are also present. In addition to Skidmore Fountain, structures within the district's boundaries include the Blagen Block, Delschneider Building, Hallock and McMillin Building, New Market Theater, New Market Alley Building, New Market Annex, and Poppleton Building.

See also

 List of National Historic Landmarks in Oregon
 List of Oregon's Most Endangered Places
 National Register of Historic Places listings in Northwest Portland, Oregon
 National Register of Historic Places listings in South and Southwest Portland, Oregon

References

External links
 

Geography of Portland, Oregon
Historic districts on the National Register of Historic Places in Oregon
National Historic Landmarks in Oregon
National Register of Historic Places in Portland, Oregon
Northwest Portland, Oregon
Old Town Chinatown
Oregon's Most Endangered Places
Southwest Portland, Oregon